Federal Highway 81 (Carretera Federal 81) connects Llera de Canales, Tamaulipas, to González, Tamaulipas.

References

081